Environmental health is the branch of public health concerned with all aspects of the natural and built environment affecting human health. In order to effectively control factors that may affect health, the requirements that must be met in order to create a healthy environment must be determined. Environmental health focuses on the natural and built environments for the benefit of human health. The major sub-disciplines of environmental health are environmental science, toxicology, environmental epidemiology, and environmental and occupational medicine.

Definitions

WHO definitions
Environmental health was defined in a 1989 document by the World Health Organization (WHO) as:
Those aspects of human health and disease that are determined by factors in the environment. It is also referred to as the theory and practice of accessing and controlling factors in the environment that can potentially affect health.

A 1990 WHO document states that environmental health, as used by the WHO Regional Office for Europe, "includes both the direct pathological effects of chemicals, radiation and some biological agents, and the effects (often indirect) on health and well being of the broad physical, psychological, social and cultural environment, which includes housing, urban development, land use and transport."

, the WHO website on environmental health states that "Environmental health addresses all the physical, chemical, and biological factors external to a person, and all the related factors impacting behaviours. It encompasses the assessment and control of those environmental factors that can potentially affect health. It is targeted towards preventing disease and creating health-supportive environments. This definition excludes behaviour not related to environment, as well as behaviour related to the social and cultural environment, as well as genetics."

The WHO has also defined environmental health services as "those services which implement environmental health policies through monitoring and control activities. They also carry out that role by promoting the improvement of environmental parameters and by encouraging the use of environmentally friendly and healthy technologies and behaviors. They also have a leading role in developing and suggesting new policy areas."

Other considerations
The term environmental medicine may be seen as a medical specialty, or branch of the broader field of environmental health. Terminology is not fully established, and in many European countries they are used interchangeably.

Children's environmental health is the academic discipline that studies how environmental exposures in early life—chemical, nutritional, and social—influence health and development in childhood and across the entire human life span.

Other terms referring to or concerning environmental health include environmental public health and health protection.

Disciplines 

Five basic disciplines generally contribute to the field of environmental health: environmental epidemiology, toxicology, exposure science, environmental engineering, and environmental law. Each of these five disciplines contributes different information to describe problems and solutions in environmental health. However, there is some overlap among them.

Environmental epidemiology studies the relationship between environmental exposures (including exposure to chemicals, radiation, microbiological agents, etc.) and human health. Observational studies, which simply observe exposures that people have already experienced, are common in environmental epidemiology because humans cannot ethically be exposed to agents that are known or suspected to cause disease. While the inability to use experimental study designs is a limitation of environmental epidemiology, this discipline directly observes effects on human health rather than estimating effects from animal studies. Environmental epidemiology is the study of the effect on human health of physical, biologic, and chemical factors in the external environment, broadly conceived. Also, examining specific populations or communities exposed to different ambient environments, Epidemiology in our environment aims to clarify the relationship that exist between physical, biologic or chemical factors and human health.
Toxicology studies how environmental exposures lead to specific health outcomes, generally in animals, as a means to understand possible health outcomes in humans. Toxicology has the advantage of being able to conduct randomized controlled trials and other experimental studies because they can use animal subjects. However, there are many differences in animal and human biology, and there can be a lot of uncertainty when interpreting the results of animal studies for their implications for human health.
Exposure science studies human exposure to environmental contaminants by both identifying and quantifying exposures. Exposure science can be used to support environmental epidemiology by better describing environmental exposures that may lead to a particular health outcome, identify common exposures whose health outcomes may be better understood through a toxicology study, or can be used in a risk assessment to determine whether current levels of exposure might exceed recommended levels. Exposure science has the advantage of being able to very accurately quantify exposures to specific chemicals, but it does not generate any information about health outcomes like environmental epidemiology or toxicology.
Environmental engineering applies scientific and engineering principles for protection of human populations from the effects of adverse environmental factors; protection of environments from potentially deleterious effects of natural and human activities; and general improvement of environmental quality.
Environmental law includes the network of treaties, statutes, regulations, common and customary laws addressing the effects of human activity on the natural environment.

Information from epidemiology, toxicology, and exposure science can be combined to conduct a risk assessment for specific chemicals, mixtures of chemicals or other risk factors to determine whether an exposure poses significant risk to human health (exposure would likely result in the development of pollution-related diseases). This can in turn be used to develop and implement environmental health policy that, for example, regulates chemical emissions, or imposes standards for proper sanitation. Actions of engineering and law can be combined to provide risk management to minimize, monitor, and otherwise manage the impact of exposure to protect human health to achieve the objectives of environmental health policy.

Concerns

Environmental health addresses all human-health-related aspects of the natural environment and the built environment. Environmental health concerns include:

 Air quality, including both ambient outdoor air and indoor air quality, which also comprises concerns about environmental tobacco smoke.
 Biosafety.
 Disaster preparedness and response.
 Climate change and its effects on health.
 Environmental racism, wherein certain groups of people can be put at higher risk for environmental hazards, such as air, soil, and water pollution. This often happens due to marginalization, economic and political processes, and ultimately, racism. Environmental racism disproportionately affects different groups globally, however generally the most marginalized groups of any given region/nation.
 Food safety, including in agriculture, transportation, food processing, wholesale and retail distribution and sale.
 Hazardous materials management, including hazardous waste management, contaminated site remediation, the prevention of leaks from underground storage tanks and the prevention of hazardous materials releases to the environment and responses to emergency situations resulting from such releases.
 Housing, including substandard housing abatement and the inspection of jails and prisons.
 Childhood lead poisoning prevention.
 Land use planning, including smart growth.
 Liquid waste disposal, including city waste water treatment plants and on-site waste water disposal systems, such as septic tank systems and chemical toilets.
 Medical waste management and disposal.
 Noise pollution control.
 Occupational health and industrial hygiene.
 Radiological health, including exposure to ionizing radiation from X-rays or radioactive isotopes.
 Recreational water illness prevention, including from swimming pools, spas and ocean and freshwater bathing places.
 Safe drinking water.
 Solid waste management, including landfills, recycling facilities, composting and solid waste transfer stations.
 Toxic chemical exposure whether in consumer products, housing, workplaces, air, water or soil.
 Vector control, including the control of mosquitoes, rodents, flies, cockroaches and other animals that may transmit pathogens.

According to recent estimates, about 5 to 10% of disability-adjusted life years (DALYs) lost are due to environmental causes in Europe. By far the most important factor is fine particulate matter pollution in urban air. Similarly, environmental exposures have been estimated to contribute to 4.9 million (8.7%) deaths and 86 million (5.7%) DALYs globally. In the United States, Superfund sites created by various companies have been found to be hazardous to human and environmental health in nearby communities. It was this perceived threat, raising the specter of miscarriages, mutations, birth defects, and cancers that most frightened the public.

Information

The Toxicology and Environmental Health Information Program (TEHIP) is a comprehensive toxicology and environmental health web site, that includes open access to resources produced by US government agencies and organizations, and is maintained under the umbrella of the Specialized Information Service at the United States National Library of Medicine. TEHIP includes links to technical databases, bibliographies, tutorials, and consumer-oriented resources. TEHIP is responsible for the Toxicology Data Network (TOXNET), an integrated system of toxicology and environmental health databases including the Hazardous Substances Data Bank, that are open access, i.e. available free of charge. TOXNET was retired in 2019.

Mapping

There are many environmental health mapping tools. TOXMAP is a geographic information system (GIS) from the Division of Specialized Information Services of the United States National Library of Medicine (NLM) that uses maps of the United States to help users visually explore data from the United States Environmental Protection Agency's (EPA) Toxics Release Inventory and Superfund Basic Research Programs. TOXMAP is a resource funded by the US federal government. TOXMAP's chemical and environmental health information is taken from the NLM's Toxicology Data Network (TOXNET) and PubMed, and from other authoritative sources.

Environmental health profession
Environmental health professionals may be known as environmental health officers, public health inspectors, environmental health specialists or environmental health practitioners. Researchers and policy-makers also play important roles in how environmental health is practiced in the field. In many European countries, physicians and veterinarians are involved in environmental health. In the United Kingdom, practitioners must have a graduate degree in environmental health and be certified and registered with the Chartered Institute of Environmental Health or the Royal Environmental Health Institute of Scotland. In Canada, practitioners in environmental health are required to obtain an approved bachelor's degree in environmental health along with the national professional certificate, the Certificate in Public Health Inspection (Canada), CPHI(C).  Many states in the United States also require that individuals have a bachelor's degree and professional licenses in order to practice environmental health. California state law defines the scope of practice of environmental health as follows:

"Scope of practice in environmental health" means the practice of environmental health by registered environmental health specialists in the public and private sector within the meaning of this article and includes, but is not limited to, organization, management, education, enforcement, consultation, and emergency response for the purpose of prevention of environmental health hazards and the promotion and protection of the public health and the environment in the following areas: food protection; housing; institutional environmental health; land use; community noise control; recreational swimming areas and waters; electromagnetic radiation control; solid, liquid, and hazardous materials management; underground storage tank control; onsite septic systems; vector control; drinking water quality; water sanitation; emergency preparedness; and milk and dairy sanitation pursuant to Section 33113 of the Food and Agricultural Code.

The environmental health profession had its modern-day roots in the sanitary and public health movement of the United Kingdom. This was epitomized by Sir Edwin Chadwick, who was instrumental in the repeal of the poor laws, and in 1884 was the founding president of the Association of Public Sanitary Inspectors, now called the Chartered Institute of Environmental Health.

See also

EcoHealth
Environmental disease
Environmental medicine
Environmental toxicology
Exposure science 
Healing environments
Health effects from noise
Industrial and organizational psychology
Nightingale's environmental theory
One Health
Pollution

Journals:
List of environmental health journals

References

Further reading

Lifestyle factors that can induce an independent and persistent low-grade systemic inflammatory response: a wholistic approach George Vrousgos, N.D. – Southern Cross University

 
Environmental social science
Environmental science